Henry Splawn Taylor (born June 21, 1942) is an American poet, author of more than 15 books of poems, translation, and nonfiction, and winner of the 1986 Pulitzer Prize for Poetry.

Taylor was born in Lincoln, Virginia, in rural Loudoun County, where he was raised as a Quaker. He went to high school at George School in Newtown, Pennsylvania. He graduated from the University of Virginia in 1965 and received his M.A. from Hollins University (formerly Hollins College) in 1966.

He taught literature and co-directed the Master of Fine Arts program in creative writing at American University from 1971–2003.

Taylor won the Pulitzer Prize for poetry in 1986 for his book The Flying Change. His additional honors include two fellowships from the National Endowment for the Arts, two awards from the American Academy and Institute of Arts and Letters, and the Aiken Taylor Award in Modern American Poetry.

Since 2015 he and his wife, fiber artist Mooshe Taylor, have lived in Santa Fe, New Mexico.

Bibliography
This Tilted World Is Where I Live: New and Selected Poems 1962-2020, Louisiana State University Press, 2020. 
Crooked Run, Louisiana State University Press, 2006. 
Brief Candles: 101 Clerihews, Louisiana State University Press, 2000. 
Electra (a verse translation of Sophocles’ play in Sophocles I), University of Pennsylvania Press, 1998. 
Understanding Fiction: Poems, 1986–1996, Louisiana State University Press, 1996. 
Curculio (a translation of the play by Titus Maccius Plautus in Plautus: The Comedies, Volume 1), Johns Hopkins University Press. 
Compulsory Figures: Essays on Recent American Poets, Louisiana State University Press, 1992. 
The Flying Change, Louisiana State University Press, 1986. 
The Children of Herakles, Oxford University Press, 1982. 
The Water of Light: A Miscellany in Honor of Brewster Ghiselin, University of Utah Press, 1976. 
An Afternoon of Pocket Billiards, University of Utah Press, 1975. 
Poetry: Points of Departure, Winthrop, 1974. 
Breakings, Solo Press, 1969.
The Girl in the Black Raincoat, Duell, Sloan and Pearce, 1966. ASIN B000FREQKI
The Horse Show at Midnight and An Afternoon of Pocket Billiards, Louisiana State University Press, 1965.

References

External links
Interview with Taylor in the Courtland Review
List of books by Hollins alumni
 

American male poets
Pulitzer Prize for Poetry winners
Hollins University alumni
University of Virginia alumni
People from Loudoun County, Virginia
1942 births
Living people
20th-century American poets
21st-century American poets
20th-century American male writers
21st-century American male writers
George School alumni